The following is a list of rulers currently known from the history of the ancient Levantine kingdom Ammon. Ammon was originally ruled by a king, called the "king of the children of Ammon" (Ammonite: 𐤌𐤋𐤊 𐤁𐤍𐤏𐤌𐤍 maleḵ banīʿAmān). After the conquest of the Neo-Babylonian and Achaemenid Empires, Ammon was maintained by an administrator (literally "servant";  hēgoúmenos, "leader"). Only a modest number of Ammonite kings are known today, mostly from the Bible and epigraphic inscriptions.

Rulers of Ammon

Kings of Ammon

 Getal or Giteal ( Gitʾal; early 11th century B.C.) Ammonite king unnamed in  but identified by Pseudo-Philo in his Biblical Antiquities.

 Nahash ( Nāḥāš; mid eleventh century B.C.)
 Hanun son of Nahash ( Ḥānūn; early tenth century B.C.)
 Shobi son of Nahash ( Šōḇī; early tenth century B.C.)

 Rehob ( Ruḫubi; c. 850s B.C.)
 Baasha son of Rehob ( Baʿša; 853 B.C.)

 Shanip (Ammonite:  ŠNB;  Šanipu; c. 734 B.C.)
 Zacchur son of Shanip (Ammonite:  ZKR)
 Jeraheazar son of Zacchur (Ammonite:  YRḤʿZR, variously interpreted as Yəraḥʿāzār or Yariḥ-ʿezer)

 Peduel (Ammonite:  PDʾL, variously interpreted as Pədūʾēl, Padōʾēl, Pădāʾēl, or Pədāʾēl;  Pudu-ilu; c. 720s B.C.)

 Barachel ( BRKʾL; c. 670s)

 Amminadab I (Ammonite:  ʿMNDB; c. 650 B.C.)
 Hissalel son of Amminadab (Ammonite:  HṢLʾL, variously interpreted as Hiṣalʾēl ("Hissalel"), Haṣalʾēl ("Hassalel"), or Haṣilʾēl ("Hasilel"); c. 620 B.C.)
 Amminadab II son of Hissalel (c. 600 B.C.)

 Baalis ( Baʿălīs; Ammonite:  BʿLYŠʿ, variously interpreted as  Baʿlyīšaʿ, Baʿlyīšʿ, or Baʿlīšāʿ; 580s B.C.)

Administrators of Ammon

 Tobiah ( Ṭōḇīyyā; fifth century B.C.)
 Timothy ( Timótheos; second century B.C.)

See also
 List of rulers of Moab
 List of rulers of Edom
 Ammon
 Lot (biblical person)

References

 
Ammon